The Goose Girl is a German fairy tale collected by the brothers Grimm.

The Goose Girl may also refer to:

The Goose Girl (Bouguereau),  a painting by William-Adolphe Bouguereau
The Goose Girl (novel), by Shannon Hale
The Goose Girl, a 1909 novel by Harold MacGrath
The Goose Girl (1915 film), a 1915 film adaptation starring Marguerite Clark
The Goose Girl (1957 film)

See also
Gänseliesel (English: Goose Girl), a fountain in Göttingen, Germany